Francesco Cairo (26 September 1607 – 27 July 1665), also known as Francesco del Cairo,  was an Italian Baroque painter active in Lombardy and Piedmont.

Biography
He was born and died in Milan. It is not known where he obtained his early training though he is strongly influenced by the circle of il Morazzone, in works such as the Saint Teresa altarpiece in the Certosa di Pavia.

In 1633, Cairo moved to Turin to work as a court painter, including portraits, to Vittorio Amedeo I of the House of Savoy. Between 1637 and 1638, Cairo travelled to Rome, where he encounters the works of Pietro da Cortona, Guido Reni and of the Caravaggisti. He returns to Lombardy to complete altarpieces for the Certosa of Pavia and a church at Casalpusterlengo. He painted a St. Theresa for San Carlo in Venice. Between 1646 and 1649, he returns to Turin, and paints an altarpiece for Savigliano and the church of San Salvario. He is also known as Il Cavalière del Cairo, because in Turin, he received the Order of Saints Maurice and Lazarus in recognition of his merit.

Many of his works are eccentric depictions of religious ecstasies; the saints appear liquefied and contorted by piety. He often caps them with exuberant, oriental turbans. He is sometimes compared with his Milanese contemporary, Carlo Francesco Nuvolone, also called il Panfilo. Ludovico Antonio David, Giulio Coralli, and Pietro Scalvini were among his pupils.

Sources

1607 births
1665 deaths
17th-century Italian painters
Italian male painters
Painters from Milan
Italian Baroque painters
Court painters
Painters from Lombardy
Painters from Turin